Anabarilius transmontanus is a species of cyprinid fish. It is known from the Red River and Pearl River drainages in Yunnan, China; it is expected to occur in northern Vietnam. It can grow to  total length, although it is commonly around  standard length. It occurs in both rivers and lakes. The species is threatened by domestic and urban water pollution, habitat loss, and possibly non-native species.

References

transmontanus
Cyprinid fish of Asia
Freshwater fish of China
Taxa named by John Treadwell Nichols
Fish described in 1925